Governor Parker may refer to:

David Stuart Parker (1919–1990), 16th Governor of the Panama Canal Zone
Henry Parker (Georgia official) (1690–1777), Colonial Governor of Georgia from 1751 until 1752
Joel Parker (politician) (1816–1888), 20th Governor of New Jersey
John Frederick Parker (United States Navy) (1853–1911), Governor of American Samoa from 1908 to 1910
John M. Parker (1863–1939), 37th Governor of Louisiana